François-Jean Wyns de Raucour (or Raucourt), knight (6 November 1779 – 4 January 1857), was a Belgian liberal politician and burgomaster of Brussels.

He was a lawyer and became alderman and burgomaster of Brussels (1840–1848). François-Jean Wyns de Raucour was also a member of the provincial council of Brabant and a member of the Belgian Senate.

Honours 
 Knight in the Order of Leopold.
 Knight of the Legion of Honour.

See also
 List of mayors of the City of Brussels

References

Sources
 Du Bois, A., "Les Bourgmestres de Bruxelles", in : Revue de Belgique, April 1896, pp. 365–396.
 De Paepe, Jean-Luc, Raindorf-Gérard, Christiane (red), Le Parlement Belge 1831-1894. Données Biographiques, Brussels, Académie Royale de Belgique, 1996, pp. 626–627.
 Pergameni, Ch., in : Biographie Nationale, Brussels, Académie Royale des Sciences, des Lettres et des Beaux Arts, 1866–1986, XXVII, 1936–1938, col. 422–424.

1779 births
1857 deaths
Mayors of the City of Brussels